The T & G Building stands on the corner of Queen Street and Albert Street in Brisbane, Queensland, Australia.

The original building named for the T&G (Temperance and General) Mutual Life Assurance Society Company stood from 1923 to 1966.

Occupation during World War II 
The building was taken over by Lieutenant Robert Melloy of the Hirings Section, No. 1 Lines of Communication (No. 1 L of C), Australian Army, and was occupied from 20 February 1943 to 31 December 1944. The tenants of the building resisted the occupation, led by a Dr Streeter, and they formed a committee to submit a protest to the Federal Government. Lt. Melloy agreed to help them submit their protest, on the condition that they vacate the premises immediately a decision was made. Two hours after submitting their protest, Lt. Melloy received orders to proceed with the military occupation of the building. Upon being advised by Lt. Melloy of the outcome, Dr. Streeter was one of the first to leave the building. The building was used as the Headquarters for the US Army Forces in the Far East.

New T&G Building 
In 1969 a new version of the building was completed on the original site. It is 25 storeys high and at the time was Brisbane's tallest building.

Today the building houses a variety of businesses, including a doctors' surgery, and a hairdressing salon.  Other businesses include a watch repairer and taxation accountant. An arcade was established at the ground level.

See also
T & G Mutual Life Assurance Society
T & G Building, Geelong

References

Buildings and structures in Brisbane
Queen Street, Brisbane